Beaumont Middle School is a decommissioned middle school located in Kissimmee, Florida. Beaumont once served as the magnet middle school for the Osceola County region. Other students, many under protest, were relegated to Denn John Middle School, located on the outskirts of Kissimmee, FL, while Beaumont celebrated its proximity to the seat of Osceola County government and center of its commerce at Lat: 28.29528 Lon: -81.41056.

History 
Beaumont was built a few blocks from Lake Toho and downtown Kissimmee, at the corner of Beaumont and Sumner St. Classes ceased in the main High School building in 1975. During the 1974-1975 school year, the student body was cut in half, with those generally north and east of the campus being assigned to the new Denn- John school which was under construction. Those assigned to Denn-John were placed in classrooms in the old original Osceola High School building, and those assigned to stay at Beaumont Middle occupied the newer section of campus. Common areas such as the cafeteria, shop, PE and Home Ec. were shared. Each school had its own office and administrators, the office for Denn John being in the Old building. In January 1975, the new Denn-John middle school campus was completed, and all the students assigned to that school moved to the new campus. At that time the Original Osceola High School building was no longer being used for students. The School Districts Audio-visual department and 16MM film library continued to be housed at that site, as it had been for several years prior to the closure to students in 1975.

The property however remained in use by the county as a textbook storage facility and by truant students looking for a quick smoke.

Recently, the location was investigated by treasure hunters, who found many unique items, but no American Civil War musket balls.

Decline and abandonment 
In 1998, Beaumont closed its doors to the youth of Kissimmee. The county purchased the property and many of the Beaumont buildings were torn down, lost forever. Others were renovated by the county and now serve as a new middle school. property appraiser.

Fire and redemption 
In June 1999, lightning produced by a severe thunderstorm ignited a fire that consumed the historic portion of Beaumont. Osceola County officials determined the building a complete casualty and planned to re-develop the site as office buildings. A coalition of former students argued for the design and construction of a community center. In the end, neither plan was approved. This portion of the site remains vacant.

Future 
Beaumont Middle school buildings now contain a mix of county and state offices. In September 2017 Osceola County sold the property, technically located at 310 N. Beaumont Ave., to the city of Kissimmee.

References

Schools in Kissimmee, Florida
Defunct schools in Florida
Educational institutions disestablished in 1975